Edward James Devitt (May 5, 1911 – March 2, 1992) was a United States representative from Minnesota and a United States district judge of the United States District Court for the District of Minnesota.

Education and career

Born in Saint Paul, Ramsey County, Minnesota, Devitt graduated from St. John's College Preparatory High School in Collegeville, Minnesota in 1930, and attended St. John's University from 1930 to 1932 before receiving a Bachelor of Laws from the University of North Dakota School of Law in Grand Forks, North Dakota in 1935, and a Bachelor of Science degree from the University of North Dakota in 1938. Devitt was in private practice in East Grand Fords, Minnesota from 1935 to 1939, serving at the same time as a municipal judge of the Minnesota Municipal Court in East Grand Forks. He was an assistant state attorney general of Minnesota from 1939 to 1942. He served in the United States Naval Reserve during World War II as a Lieutenant Commander from 1942 to 1946.

Congressional service

Devitt was elected as a Republican to the 80th congress (January 3, 1947 – January 3, 1949). He was unsuccessful in his bid for reelection to the 81st congress in 1948. Following his departure from Congress, he returned to private practice in Saint Paul from 1949 to 1950. He then served as a Judge of the Minnesota Probate Court for Ramsey County, Minnesota from 1950 to 1954.

Federal judicial service

On December 10, 1954, Devitt received a recess appointment from President Dwight D. Eisenhower to a seat on the United States District Court for the District of Minnesota vacated by Judge Matthew M. Joyce. Formally nominated to the same seat by President Eisenhower on January 10, 1955, Devitt was confirmed by the United States Senate on February 4, 1955, and received his commission on February 7, 1955. He served as Chief Judge from 1959 to 1981, assuming senior status on May 1, 1981. In 1979, Devitt presided over the criminal trial for the five Red Lake Reservation uprising defendants, imposing a 26-year prison sentence on uprising leader Harry S. Hanson Jr. Devitt would also impose prison sentences ranging from 10 to 16 years against Hanson's four co-defendants. He served as a board member of the Federal Judicial Center from 1968 to 1971. He served as a judge of the United States Foreign Intelligence Surveillance Court from 1985 to 1992. Devitt remained in senior status until his death, in Saint Paul on March 2, 1992.

Legacy

The American Judicature Society has awarded the Edward J. Devitt Distinguished Service to Justice Award each year since 1983 to an Article III judge. The first recipient was Albert Branson Maris.

See also
Edward J. Devitt U.S. Courthouse and Federal Building in Fergus Falls, Minnesota

References

External links

 
  American Judicature Society awards page

1911 births
1992 deaths
Politicians from Saint Paul, Minnesota
Military personnel from Minnesota
University of North Dakota alumni
Minnesota state court judges
Judges of the United States District Court for the District of Minnesota
United States district court judges appointed by Dwight D. Eisenhower
20th-century American judges
United States Navy officers
Republican Party members of the United States House of Representatives from Minnesota
20th-century American lawyers
20th-century American politicians
Judges of the United States Foreign Intelligence Surveillance Court